Kees is a masculine nickname,  contracted (shortened) name, or given name common in the Netherlands, originally derived from the name Cornelis. An alternate spelling is Cees.

Notable people with the given name Kees include:

 Kees van Dongen 1877–1968, Dutch-French painter
 Kees van Baaren (1906–1970), Dutch composer and teacher
 Kees Bakels (born 1945), Dutch conductor
 Kees Blom (born 1946), Dutch ecologist
 Kees Bol (1916–2009), Dutch painter and art educator
 Kees Broekman (1927–1992), Dutch speed skater
 Kees Brusse (born 1925), Dutch actor and film director
 Kees Bruynzeel (1900–1980), Dutch businessman, timber merchant and yachtsman
 Kees Fens (1929–2009), Dutch writer, essayist and literary critic
 Kees Kist (born 1952), Dutch footballer
 Kees van Kooten (born 1941), Dutch comedian, television actor and author
 Kees van Kooten (footballer) (born 1948), Dutch footballer
 Kees Kwakman (born 1983), Dutch footballer
 Kees Luyckx (born 1986), Dutch footballer
 Kees Maks (1876–1967), Dutch painter
 Kees Meeuws (born 1974), New Zealand rugby union prop
 Kees Moeliker (born 1960), Dutch biologist
 Kees Ouwens (1944–2004), Dutch novelist and poet
 Kees Pijl (1897–1976), Dutch footballer
 Kees van Prooijen (born 1952), Dutch artist and musicologist
 Kees Rietveld (born 1969), Dutch singer, known as Georgie Davis
 Kees Rijvers, (born 1926), Dutch footballer
 Kees Schouhamer Immink (born 1946), Dutch scientist, inventor, and entrepreneur
 Kees van der Staaij (born 1968), Dutch politician
 Kees Teer (born 1925), Dutch electrical engineer
 Kees Pier Tol, (born 1958), Dutch footballer
 Kees Tol (footballer) (born 1987), Dutch footballer
 Kees Torn (born 1967), Dutch text writer and comedy performer
 Kees Vendrik (born 1963), Dutch politician
 Kees Verkade (born 1941), Dutch artist and sculptor
 Kees Verkerk (born 1942), Dutch speed skater
 Kees Versteegh (born 1947), Dutch linguist
 Kees Zwamborn (born 1952), Dutch footballer
 Kees van der Spek (born 1964), Dutch journalist

See also 
 
 
 Cees
 Kees (surname)

References 

Dutch masculine given names